Andrew Mack, born William Andrew McAloon, (July 25, 1863 – May 21, 1931) was an American vaudevillian, actor, singer and songwriter of Irish descent.

Biography
A native of Boston, Massachusetts, he began his career at an early age in 1876 using the stage name Andrew Williams.  He began in minstrel shows, and was especially associated with the song "A Violet From Mother's Grave". In 1892, he debuted in vaudeville.

He composed songs for himself to sing.  In 1899, he composed the popular song "The Story of the Rose (Heart of My Heart)" which became a standard of barbershop quartets.

Partial filmography
Bluebeard's Seven Wives (1926)

References

See also
Heart of My Heart

External links 

Andrew Mack discography at UC Santa Barbara Library, Discography of American Historical Recordings
Sheet music for "The Story of the Rose" at Johns Hopkins University, Levy Sheet Music Collection

1863 births
1931 deaths
Male actors from Boston
American people of Irish descent